Marcia Lee Macdonald (born 1944) is an American  photographer who worked with gelatin silver prints.

Her work is included in the collections of the National Gallery of Canada, the Harvard Art Museums, the Art Institute of Chicago, the Princeton University Art Museum, and the RISD Museum.

References

21st-century American women artists
21st-century American photographers
20th-century American women artists
20th-century American photographers
1944 births
Living people